Norrington is a surname. Notable people with the surname include:

Arthur Lionel Pugh Norrington (1899–1982), English publisher
Humphrey Thomas Norrington (20th century), British banker
Roger Norrington (born 1934), British conductor
Stephen Norrington (born 1964), English film director

Fictional characters
James Norrington, a character in the Pirates of the Caribbean films

See also
Norrington Manor, Alvediston, Wiltshire, England
Norrington Table, an annual ranking of the colleges of the University of Oxford, England, refined by Arthur Norrington

English-language surnames